The index case or patient zero is the first documented patient in a disease epidemic within a population, or the first documented patient included in an epidemiological study. 
It can also refer to the first case of a condition or syndrome (not necessarily contagious) to be described in the medical literature, whether or not the patient is thought to be the first person affected. An index case can achieve the status of a "classic" case study in the literature, as did Phineas Gage, the first known person to exhibit a definitive personality change as a result of a brain injury.

Term

The index case may or may not indicate the source of the disease, the possible spread, or which reservoir holds the disease in between outbreaks, but may bring awareness of an emerging outbreak. Earlier cases may or may not be found and are labeled primary or coprimary, secondary, tertiary, etc. The term primary case can only apply to infectious diseases that spread from human to human, and refers to the person who first brings a disease into a group of people. In epidemiology, the term is often used by both scientists and journalists alike to refer to the individual known or believed to have been the first infected or source of the resulting outbreak in a population as the index case, but such would technically refer to the primary case.

Origin of Patient Zero
"Patient zero" was used to refer to the supposed source of HIV outbreak in the United States, flight attendant Gaëtan Dugas in the popular press, but the term's use was based on a misunderstanding (and Dugas was not the index case). In the 1984 study of Centers for Disease Control and Prevention (CDC), one of the earliest recorded HIV-patients was code-named "patient O", which stands for "patient out of California". The letter O, however, was interpreted by some readers of the report as the numeral 0. The designation patient zero (for Gaëtan Dugas) was subsequently propagated by the San Francisco Chronicle journalist Randy Shilts in his book And the Band Played On in 1987. William Darrow,  behavioral scientist of CDC responsible to figure out why gay men in Los Angeles were dying of a strange illness, said: "That's correct. I never labeled him Patient Zero".

The term has been expanded into general usage to refer to an individual identified as the first carrier of a communicable disease in a population (the primary case) or pandemics, or the first incident in the onset of a catastrophic trend. In some cases, a known or suspected patient zero may be informally referred to as an index case for the purpose of a scientific study, such as the two-year-old boy in a remote village in Guinea who was thought to be the source of the largest Ebola virus outbreak in history., or unknown  one, such as the mysterious patient zero of COVID-19.

In genetics, the index case is the case of the original patient (i.e. propositus or proband) that stimulates investigation of other members of the family to discover a possible genetic factor.

The term can also be used in non-medical fields to describe the first individual affected by something negative that since propagated to others, such as the first user on a network infected by malware.

Examples

Gaëtan Dugas 

In the early years of the AIDS epidemic, a patient zero transmission scenario was compiled by William Darrow and colleagues at the United States Centers for Disease Control and Prevention (CDC). This epidemiological study showed how patient zero had infected multiple partners with HIV, and they, in turn, transmitted it to others causing rapid spread of the virus to locations all over the world (Auerbach et al., 1984). The CDC identified Gaëtan Dugas as a carrier of the virus from Europe to the United States, who spread it to other men he had sexual contact with at gay bathhouses.

Journalist Randy Shilts subsequently wrote about patient zero, based on Darrow's findings, in his 1987 book And the Band Played On, which identified patient zero as being Gaëtan Dugas. Dugas was a flight attendant who was sexually promiscuous in several North American cities, according to Shilts' book. He was vilified for several years as a "mass spreader" of HIV, and was seen as the original source of the HIV epidemic among homosexual men. Four years later, Darrow repudiated the study's methodology and how Shilts had represented its conclusions.

A 2007 study by Michael Worobey and Arthur Pitchenik published in the Proceedings of the National Academy of Sciences of the United States of America claimed that, based on the results of genetic analysis, current North American strains of HIV probably moved from Africa to Haiti before entering the United States around 1969, probably through a single immigrant. However, a teenager named Robert Rayford died in St. Louis, Missouri, possibly of complications from AIDS in 1969, having most likely become infected with the virus before 1966. This would imply that there were prior carriers of HIV-strains in North America.

The phrase patient zero is now used in the media to refer to the primary case for infectious disease outbreaks, as well as for computer virus outbreaks, and more broadly, as the source of ideas or actions that have far-reaching consequences.

David Heymann, professor of Infectious Disease Epidemiology at the London School of Hygiene & Tropical Medicine, and formerly with the World Health Organization (WHO), has questioned the importance of finding patient zero, stating, "Finding patient zero may be important in some instances, but only if they are still alive and spreading the disease; and more often than not, especially in large disease outbreaks, they're not."

Others 

 Mary Mallon ("Typhoid Mary") was an index case of a typhoid outbreak in the early 1900s. An apparently healthy carrier, she infected 47 people while working as a cook. She eventually was isolated to prevent her from spreading the disease to others.
 The first recorded victim of Ebola was a 44-year-old schoolteacher named Mabalo Lokela, who died on 8 September 1976, 14 days after symptom onset. 
 64-year-old Liu Jianlun, a Guangdong doctor, transmitted SARS internationally by infecting other super-spreaders during a stay in the Hong Kong Metropole Hotel in 2003.
 A baby in the Lewis House at 40 Broad Street is considered the index patient in the 1854 cholera outbreak in the Soho neighborhood of London. (The Ghost Map, Steven Johnson, 2005.)
 Édgar Enrique Hernández may be patient zero of the 2009 flu pandemic. He recovered, and a bronze statue has been erected in his honor. Maria Adela Gutierrez, who contracted the virus about the same time as Hernández, became the first officially confirmed fatality.
 One-year-old Emile Ouamouno is believed to be patient zero in the 2014 Ebola epidemic in Guinea and West Africa.
51-year-old Jesus Lujan was the index case of the 1924 Los Angeles pneumonic plague outbreak which killed 33.
Sgt. Albert M. Gitchell is commonly believed to be the index patient of the Spanish flu, which killed 50,000,000 from 1918 to 1920. Gitchell survived and died in 1968.
 As for the COVID-19 pandemic, there are many known "patient zeros" across the world known for different symptoms and stories. Out of Los Angeles, patient zero Gregg Garfield spent 64 days in the hospital, including 30 days of coma-state after contracting the virus on a ski trip. Doctors said he had a 1% chance to live. He survived, but had fingers and toes amputated.
 A foreign tarento claimed to be infected with "Hanako-san flu" (termed COVID-19) after orally ingesting pathogen-contaminated toilet water on 5 March 2019 during a taping of Why Did You Come to Japan? (broadcast 17 June 2019).
 Another patient zero of the COVID-19 pandemic includes an elderly man who was diagnosed on 1 December 2019, someone who had no contact with the Huanan Seafood Wholesale Market. Three other people experienced symptoms in the following days who also did not have contact with the Market.

Non-medical usage

The term is used to identify the first computer or user to be infected with malware on a network, which then infected other systems.

Monica Lewinsky has described herself as the "patient zero" of online harassment, meaning that she was the first person to receive widespread public harassment via the internet.

See also 

 
 
 Scapegoating

References

External links 
 
 Letter to the New York Review of Books (vol. 35, number 19, December 8, 1988) by Dr. Andrew Moss, Dept. of Epidemiology and International Health, San Francisco, regarding the “patient zero” myth.
"Patient Zero - Updated". Radiolab. Season 13, Episode 3. 

Epidemiology
Biological hazards